Counting Five in Sweden is a live album by trumpeter Joe Newman with Count Basie's All Stars recorded in Sweden in 1958 for the Swedish Metronome label and also released in the US on World Pacific.

Reception

AllMusic awarded the album 3 stars.

Track listing
 "Feather's Nest" (Ernie Wilkins) - 7:55
 "Ballad Medley: Easy Living/September Song/Don't Blame Me" (Ralph Rainger, Leo Robin/Kurt Weill/Jimmy McHugh) - 6:30
 "The Sleeper" (Wilkins) - 7:20
 "Cute" (Neal Hefti) - 5:55
 "Slats" (Joe Newman) - 8:45
 "When the Saints Go Marching In" (Traditional) - 6:20
Recorded in Gothenburg on October 2 (tracks 1 & 5) and Stockholm on October 13 (tracks 2-4 & 6), 1958

Personnel 
Joe Newman - trumpet
Al Grey - trombone
Frank Wess - tenor saxophone, flute
Nat Pierce - piano
Eddie Jones - bass
Sonny Payne - drums
Putte Wickman - clarinet (track 6)

References 

1958 live albums
Joe Newman (trumpeter) live albums
Warner Music Sweden albums
World Pacific Records live albums